Gornji Slaveči is a village in the Municipality of Kuzma in the Prekmurje region of Slovenia.

Name
The name Gornji Slaveči (literally, 'upper Slaveči') contrasts with the name Dolnji Slaveči (literally, 'lower Slaveči'), a village in the neighboring Municipality of Grad. Dolnji Slaveči lies about  lower in elevation than Gornji Slaveči.

History
Under the Austro-Hungarian Empire, the village was part of the lordship of Grad. Until 1920 Gornji Slaveči belonged to Hungary, and after the Treaty of Trianon it belonged to Yugoslavia. During the Second World War it was annexed by Hungary, and after 1945 it belonged to Yugoslavia again. Since the foundation of the Republic of Slovenia it has belonged to Slovenia.

Church
There is a large Lutheran church in the settlement. It was built in 1928.

Notable residents
Ludvik Čurman/Csurmann (1913–1943), Lutheran priest and resistance fighter in the Second World War, died in Russia
Rudolf Čurman/Csurmann (1898–1945), farmer and resistance fighter in the Second World War, died in Schörzingen

References

External links
Gornji Slaveči on Geopedia

Populated places in the Municipality of Kuzma